Sandford is a village near Strathaven, South Lanarkshire in Scotland. It has 50 houses and 200 inhabitants. Sandford also has two parks and a bus shed which houses 5 buses overnight. The village is home to one of the oldest mills in Avondale.

The village is a part of Sandford and Upper Avondale Community Council.

Footnotes

Villages in South Lanarkshire